Wyoming Highway 217 (WYO 217) was a state highway in the southeastern part of Laramie County, Wyoming.

Route description 
Wyoming Highway 217 traveled from I-80/US 30 (Exit 377) south for 4.42 miles. Highway 217 ended at Milepost 4.42   and continued as Laramie County Route 140. 

The route was decommissioned in 2009; all state route marker signs have been removed, and the route no longer appears on the Wyoming Official State Highway Map.

Major intersections

References

External links

WYO 217 - I-80/US 30 to Crow Creek

Transportation in Laramie County, Wyoming
217